SLAM is a manufacturer of clothing, specializing in sportswear (sailing wear), based in Genoa and founded in 1979.

External links
 Official Site

Italian brands
Clothing companies established in 1979
Shoe companies of Italy
Shoe brands
Privately held companies of Italy
Manufacturing companies based in Genoa
Italian companies established in 1979
Sailing equipment manufacturers
Sporting goods manufacturers of Italy
Companies based in Genoa